The Miramar Police Department is a municipal police agency responsible for law enforcement within the city of Miramar, Florida.  The department is accredited by the Commission on Accreditation for Law Enforcement Agencies and the Commission for Florida Law Enforcement Accreditation.  The current interim police chief is Leonard Burgess.

The Miramar Police Department was for some time headquartered in a strip mall. In 2005, a hurricane damaged their old building and the city has had difficulty finding a suitable replacement.  The police department is currently located at 11765 City Hall Promenade, Miramar, FL 33025

See also

List of U.S. state and local law enforcement agencies

References

External links
 http://www.miramarpd.org

Municipal police departments of Florida
Miramar, Florida
1955 establishments in Florida